Chagri Dorjeden Monastery, also called Cheri Monastery, is a Buddhist monastery in Bhutan established in 1620 by Ngawang Namgyal, 1st Zhabdrung Rinpoche, the founder of the Bhutanese state.

It sits on a hill above the end of the road at Dodeyna and it takes about an hour to walk up the steep hill to reach the monastery from there.

According to Bhutanese religious histories, the place was first visited by Padmasambhava in the 8th century. In the 13th century it was visited by Phajo Drugom Zhigpo the Tibetan Lama who first established the Drukpa Kagyu tradition in Bhutan. Johnsingh (2005) describes the beauty of the place and the occurrence of goral there.

Chagri Dorjeden was the first monastery established in Bhutan by Ngawang Namgyal in 1620 when he was 27 years old. The Zhabdrung spent three years in strict retreat at Chagri and resided there for many periods throughout the rest of his life. It was at Chagri in 1623 that he established the first Drukpa monastic order in Bhutan.

In 1705, the 7th Druk Desi, Umze Peljor, retired to Chagri Monastery, where he lived until his death in 1707.

References

Sources

 Ardussi, John (2004);  Formation of the State of Bhutan ('Brug gzhung) in the 17th century and its Tibetan Antecedents in Journal of Bhutan Studies, Vol 11 2004, Centre for Bhutan Studies, Thimphu.  
 Dargye, Yonten and Sørensen, P.K. (2001); The Biography of Pha 'Brug-sgom Zhig-po called The Current of Compassion. Thumphu:   National Library of Bhutan.  

 

 
Johnsingh, A. J. T. 2005. A paradise in the Himalaya. Frontline, January, 28: 67–72.

Drukpa Kagyu monasteries and temples in Bhutan
1620 establishments in Bhutan
Tibetan Buddhism in Bhutan
17th-century Buddhist temples